The Wycombe by-election of 27 April 1978 was held after the death of Conservative Member of Parliament (MP) John Hall. The Conservatives held on to the seat in the by-election.

Results

References

1978 elections in the United Kingdom
1978 in England
By-elections to the Parliament of the United Kingdom in Buckinghamshire constituencies
Wycombe District
20th century in Buckinghamshire
April 1978 events in the United Kingdom